Jelena Despotović (born 30 April 1994) is a Montenegrin handball player for Győri ETO KC and the Montenegrin national team.

Personal life 
Her partner is Bogdan Radivojevic handball player. Their daughter Helena was born in August 2022.

References

External links

1994 births
Living people
Sportspeople from Podgorica
Montenegrin female handball players
Olympic handball players of Montenegro
Handball players at the 2020 Summer Olympics
Montenegrin expatriate sportspeople in Hungary
Montenegrin expatriate sportspeople in Slovenia
Expatriate handball players
Mediterranean Games medalists in handball
Mediterranean Games silver medalists for Montenegro
Competitors at the 2018 Mediterranean Games